Phryganistria chinensis is a recently discovered (in 2017) walking stick insect native to south-western China. It is the longest of all known insects, being up to 62.4 centimeters (24.6 inches) in length and is believed to exceed the weight of any known insect.

References

Phasmatidae
Insects of China
Insects described in 2017